Dragan Vasiljković (born 12 December 1954), nicknamed Captain Dragan is a convicted war criminal and the former commander of a Serb paramilitary unit called the Knindže or ("Knin ninjas") during the Yugoslav Wars. In 2005, prosecutors in Croatia accused him of committing war crimes during the wars. A warrant for his arrest was subsequently issued by Interpol. 

He was arrested in Australia in January 2006, and ordered to prison by the High Court of Australia in anticipation for extradition to Croatia to face prosecution for his alleged crimes. He was extradited to Croatia on 8 July 2015 after losing his thirteenth appeal and sentenced to 15 years in prison on 26 September 2017 by the County Court in the city of Split. 

Dragan was released from prison in March 2020.

Early life
Dragan Vasiljković was born on 12 December 1954 in a Serbian Orthodox family in Belgrade. His father Živorad died in a motorcycle accident while Dragan was still young. At the age of 3, his mother moved to Australia with her two children from a previous marriage, and Vasiljković ended up in an orphanage and later a foster home.
At the age of thirteen he joined his mother and two siblings in Australia under the name Daniel Snedden.

As a juvenile, he ended up in trouble with the law several times: one time he was accused of robbery and selling stolen goods, a second time he was charged with forcing women into prostitution. At the suggestion of a judge, he joined the army. He spent 4 years in the Australian Army's reserve unit 4th/19th Prince of Wales's Light Horse. After his military service, he served as a weapons instructor in Africa and South America. He was sailing around the world and stayed in Serbia in 1988 where he set up a boat and airplane charter business. He was convicted of criminal charges in relation to brothel ownership in Elsternwick, a suburb of Melbourne, Australia during the 1980s. He also worked as a golf instructor in Australia.

War in Croatia
He returned to Belgrade in May 1990, as Croatia held its first parliamentary elections. In Belgrade, Vasiljković met Saša Medaković, one of the leaders of the barricades in Krajina following the "Log Revolution" in August.

Medaković was a friend of Knin chief of police Milan Martić, and was an employee of Krajina state security. Vasiljković visited Krajina in the autumn 1990. There, he met Martić and claimed that the defence of Krajina appeared "very disorganised". He thus decided to help organise the Krajina defence. On his return to Belgrade, he attempted to gather support for his effort, and became a member of the opposition Serbian Renewal Movement. He then returned to the United States to complete his aviator training.

During the March 1991 Belgrade upheaval when the Serbian Renewal Movement's challenge to the government was met with tanks in the streets, Vasiljković was compelled to return there. Srba Milovanov introduced him to several Serbian State Security personnel, among them Franko Simatović. Simatović told him of his Krajina-related activities that if his bosses were to learn about it, he would probably be arrested and dismissed. On 4 April, Vasiljković went to Krajina to work for Milan Martić.

On 25 June 1991, Croatia proclaimed its independence; soon after, war broke out in Croatia. He served during the Croatian War of Independence under the newly created Republic of Serbian Krajina as a volunteer; International Criminal Tribunal for the former Yugoslavia prosecutors claim that this service took place under Serbian police auspices, and media even reported that he claimed this during his testimony at the Slobodan Milošević trial in 2003.

He commanded special units known as Red Berets. He trained units at Krajina's Golubić training camp for which he was allegedly paid by the State Security Service of Serbia; he denied this at the Milosevic trial, despite his role as a prosecution witness. He added that the only time that the Serbian State Security paid him was for a 28-day stint in 1997 "to monitor exercises"; his fee was 2,200 dinars. He was allied with Interior Minister Milan Martić in his power struggle with president Milan Babić, whom he described as "dishonest, a man who was not of his word." Martić, in contrast, he considered to be "a man of honour and a man of his word."

In November 1991, Babić called Vojislav Šešelj to Knin to help him thwart what he believed to be a coup attempt being planned by Vasiljković himself. According to Šešelj, "Captain Dragan interfered and started a rebellion among the army ranks", and organised a rally of military personnel. The rally, Šešelj said, proved a failure and Babic remained in power. Šešelj also testified at the Milosevic trial that Vasiljković had a training camp in Golubic.
During the war, he founded the Fond Kapetan Dragan aimed at helping victims of war.

Life in Serbia
After the end of combat in Croatia and Bosnia and Herzegovina, Vasiljković returned to Serbia where he lived for several years. Vasiljković was involved in the Serbian Renewal Movement. He maintained his friendship with Franko Simatović, and in 2001 stated that he would defend him in court if necessary. Simatović was arrested and transferred to the International Criminal Tribunal for the former Yugoslavia (ICTY) in 2003.

Vasiljković reemerged in the spotlight after he testified against Slobodan Milošević in 2004 at the ICTY, and subsequently moved back to Perth, Western Australia.

Allegation
In September 2005, an article in The Australian newspaper accused Dragan Vasiljković of war crimes as a Serbian paramilitary commander between 1991 and 1994. Vasiljković made a short return to Serbia and held a press conference in Belgrade before returning to Australia. He lodged a public defamation case against the publishing company Nationwide News for the article, but in December 2009 the court ruled against Vasiljković, and ordered him to pay them $1.2 million.

Vasiljković was arrested on the basis of a Croatian warrant in January.
He is accused by the Republic of Croatia of being responsible for soldiers under his command allegedly torturing, beating and killing captured members of Croatian Army and Police between June and July 1991 in a prison on the fortress in Knin, and also for making plans to attack and take over the Glina Police station, a near city village Jukince and the villages Gornji i Donji Viduševac in February 1993 at Benkovac (in agreement with the commander of the tank unit JNA). It is alleged that during that, in violation of the Geneva convention, civil buildings were damaged and ruined, Croatian citizens' property was robbed and civilians were wounded and killed, including a German journalist, Egon Scotland.
Those accusations were made public after the newspaper The Australian reported a story about him.

Dragan subsequently sued The Australian for defamation. In July 2007, the Supreme Court held that 6 out of 10 imputations in that article were defamatory (The Australian – Majority rules Dragan defamed). However, in December 2009, a judge ruled that Vasiljković "committed torture and rape" and that The Australian article from 2005 proved that Vasiljković participated and committed the allegations against him.

Vasiljković gave evidence during Milosević's trial at the Hague in 2003 without immunity. The ICTY Hague Tribunal named Vasiljković as a "participant in a joint criminal enterprise" against Croats and other non-Serbs in the judgement against Milan Martic, but did not request his arrest.

All of the others named are either already on trial at the Hague or at large. In 2005, ICTY spokesperson Florence Hartmann announced that Vasiljković had been under investigation, but that it had stopped due to the mandate on the tribunal to finish its work.

Extradition hearing in Australia
In December 2006, Vasiljković's bid to prevent his extradition hearing from going ahead failed in the Sydney Magistrates Court. His grounds of defense were that as a Serbian Captain, he believed that he would be facing a biased Croatian Court and that no evidence of the allegations are required under the Extradition Act 1988, for an Australian citizen to be extradited.

On 12 April 2007, authorities in Sydney granted Croatia's extradition request, with Vasiljković being held pending appeal at Parklea Correctional Centre in its maximum security section on protection. By April 2007, the Serbian community of Australia had spent over $500,000 on Vasiljković's defence. An application for bail pending an appeal to the Federal Court of Australia was dismissed.

On 3 February 2009, Vasiljković appeal against extradition to Croatia was rejected by the Federal Court., Among those coming to the defence of Vasiljković was the Serbian Orthodox bishop of Australia and New Zealand, Irinej Dobrijević.

On 2 September 2009, Federal Court of Australia ruled that "there was a substantial or real chance of prejudice" if he was extradited to Croatia, ordering release, pending appeal. He subsequently walked free from Parklea prison in Sydney's west on 4 September 2009.

The Australian government appealed the ruling, and in March 2010, the High Court of Australia overturned the Federal Court decision and ruled that Vasiljković should be extradited to Croatia. After the ruling, Vasiljković was nowhere to be found, prompting the Australian Federal Police to launch a nationwide manhunt.

Final arrest and appeals
Vasiljković was captured by federal police in New South Wales on 12 May 2010, 43 days after his disappearance. On 19 May, the Australian Court rejected Vasiljković's defence that Croatian courts would not give him a fair trial and that claims that Croatian courts had been more lenient towards Croats were "scanty" and "feeble".

On 16 November 2012, the Australian Government decided to extradite Vasiljković to Croatia. Vasiljković challenged the decision to the Federal Court but was unsuccessful. Vasiljković appealed to the Full Court of the Federal Court, but on 12 December 2014 the Full Court rejected the appeal, clearing him for extradition to Croatia.

On 15 May 2015, the High Court of Australia refused Vasiljković leave to appeal the December 2014 Federal Court ruling due to the unlikelihood of a successful outcome for him. Following this decision, he had no remaining legal avenue to challenge his extradition.

Extradition

On the morning of 8 July 2015, Australia surrendered Vasiljković to Croatian police officers at Sydney Airport, his thirteen separate legal challenges against the extradition process having failed. Upon arrival at Zagreb International Airport the following day, he was transferred by a high-security police motorcade to an isolated wing of a jail in Split.

Trial in Croatia
At his first interview with prosecutors, he stated that he did not feel guilty of the war crimes that they allege he committed, and dismissed his state-appointed attorney. In July 2016, he entered a formal plea of not guilty to unspecified war crimes, and the trial commenced on 20 September 2016. In September 2017, Vasiljković received a 15-year sentence by the Croatian court in Split. Upon completion of his sentence, which included the time spent in detention in Australia, he was released from prison on 28 March 2020.

References

Sources

Submission by Dr David A Chaikin to the Inquiry into Australia's Extradition Law, Policy and Practice held by the Joint Standing Committee on Treaties.
 Meaning of extradition objection
Model Treaty on Extradition
Human Rights Watch discuss bias in the courts of the Former Yugoslavia

External links

News.com.au
The Australian News.com
The Australian
Australian documentary about ´Captain Dragan´

1954 births
Living people
Military personnel from Belgrade
Serbian emigrants to Australia
Serbian people convicted of war crimes
Serbian war crimes in the Croatian War of Independence
Military personnel of the Croatian War of Independence
Fugitives wanted by Croatia
Prisoners and detainees of the Commonwealth of Australia
Candidates for President of Serbia
People extradited by Australia
People extradited to Croatia
Fugitives wanted on war crimes charges
Serbian nationalists